Todd Byrne (born ), also known by the nicknames of "Bones", "The Big Pretzel", and "Skinny", is an Australian former professional rugby league footballer who played in the 2000s.

Early life
Byrne was born in Sydney, New South Wales, Australia.

National Rugby League
Byrne as a youngster played his junior rugby league for Coogee Randwick Wombats. He then played for the Sydney Roosters and New Zealand Warriors in the National Rugby League. Byrne played a leading role in the Roosters late season charge to the 2002 premiership, playing at centre, and scoring or playing a role in many memorable Roosters tries during their 9 match unbeaten run to win the premiership. 
Having won the 2002 NRL Premiership, the Roosters traveled to England to play the 2003 World Club Challenge against Super League champions, St Helens R.F.C. Byrne played on the wing and scored a try in Easts victory.
Byrne is best remembered for being the player that Scott Sattler cover tackled in the memorable turning point of the 2003 NRL Grand Final.

Super League
Byrne moved to Super League side Hull for the 2008 season.  At the end of 2009, Byrne retired from rugby league.

Career highlights
First Grade Debut: Round 7, Sydney Roosters v Penrith at Aussie Stadium, 2 April 2001

References

External links
Stats → PastPlayers → B at hullfc.com
Statistics at hullfc.com
Statistics at rugbyleagueproject.org

1978 births
Living people
Australian rugby league players
Hull F.C. players
New Zealand Warriors players
Rugby league centres
Rugby league fullbacks
Rugby league wingers
Sydney Roosters players
Rugby league players from Sydney